Sick Octave is the fourth full-length album by Young Knives, released in the United Kingdom on 21 April 2013 on the Gadzook label.

Track listing

 "12345" – 0:26
 "Owls of Athens" – 3:55
 "We Could Be Blood" – 2:55
 "All Tied Up" – 5:37
 "White Sands" – 4:00
 "Something Awful" – 5:15
 "Preset Columns/Default Comets" – 3:32
 "Bella Bella" – 4:55
 "Marble Maze" – 4:00
 "Green Island Red Raw" – 3:22
 "Score" – 1:05
 "Bed Warmer" – 5:10
 "Maureen" – 4:05

References

2013 albums
Young Knives albums